WR 86 is a visual binary in the constellation Scorpius consisting of a Wolf-Rayet star and a β Cephei variable. It lies 2° west of NGC 6357 on the edge of the Great Rift in the Milky Way in the tail of the Scorpion.

WR 86 is a binary with two components of equal visual brightness 0.3" apart. One has the emission-line spectrum of a WC7 Wolf-Rayet star, while the other is a B0 giant. The blue giant varies slightly in brightness every 3.5 hours. The WR star may also be slightly variable.

The pulsations of the B-type giant are characteristic of a β Cephei variable. Analysis of its pulsations and comparison to the expected properties of a WC7 star suggest that both stars could have evolved without mass exchange.

References

Scorpius (constellation)
Wolf–Rayet stars
J17182306-3424306
CD−34 11622
156327
Double stars
B-type giants
Beta Cephei variables
Scorpii, V1035
084655